In the Apple macOS operating system, a package is a file system directory that is normally displayed to the user by the Finder as if it were a single file.  Such a directory may be the top-level of a directory tree of objects stored as files, or it may be other archives of files or objects for various purposes, such as installer packages, or backup archives.

Definition
The package is a common file system abstraction used by Apple operating systems, such as macOS and iOS. It is a directory that may contain a hierarchy of files or objects that represent a preserved, organized state. A package is displayed to users like a single file in the Finder application to avoid being changed by the user. However, the content of packages may be accessed through special keyboard and mouse combination events. For this purpose, the control-click, or right-click, menu displays a directive Show Package Contents.

Some documents may be represented as packages:
Rich Text Format documents with images, which carry the  extension;
Dashboard widgets;
Partially downloaded files in Safari, which carry the  extension;
Final Cut Pro X Camera Archives, which contain multiple QuickTime videos and carry the .fcarch extension;
project files in GarageBand, Keynote, Pages, Numbers, iMovie and Xcode;
Installer packages.

Bundles
A package that has a standardized structure for storing executable code and its associated resources, is called a bundle.

See also 
Installer (macOS)

References

MacOS
MacOS development